Adriano Samaniego Giménez (born 8 September 1963) is a former football striker.

Club
Samaniego started his football career in the youth divisions of Club Olimpia of Paraguay. His debut in the first team squad was in 1981. He played for Olimpia from 1981 to 1985, achieving the top scorer title of the Paraguayan League in 1985 and winning the national championship in 1981, 1982, 1983 and 1985. A serious injury kept him from playing the 1986 FIFA World Cup. After a brief stint in Mexico playing for Necaxa, he returned to Olimpia in 1990 to form the feared attacking trio of 1990 along with Raul Vicente Amarilla and Gabriel "El Loco" González, which led Olimpia to the Copa Libertadores title, Supercopa Sudamericana and Recopa of the same year. Samaniego was also the top scorer of the Copa Libertadores in 1990 with seven goals.

After his success with Olimpia, Samaniego played for Colombian side Junior de Barranquilla between 1991 and 1994, where he won the 1993 national championship, before returning again to Olimpia in 1995. Adriano Samaniego ended his career in 1998 playing for Club Guaraní. He will always be remembered for his speed and his characteristic tremendous left foot shots.

International
Samaniego made his international debut for the Paraguay national football team on 9 October 1985 in a friendly match against Chile (0-0). He obtained a total number of 26 international caps, scoring seven goals for the national side.

Honours

Club
 Olimpia
 Paraguayan Primera División: 1981, 1982, 1983, 1985, 1995, 1997
 Torneo República: 1992
 Copa Libertadores: 1990
 Supercopa Sudamericana: 1990
 Recopa Sudamericana: 1990
 Junior Barranquilla
 Colombian 1st division: 1993

Individual
 Olimpia
 Top scorer Paraguayan Primera División: 1985 (19 goals)
 Top scorer Copa Libertadores: 1990 (7 goals)

External links

 
 

1963 births
Living people
Paraguayan footballers
Paraguayan Primera División players
Categoría Primera A players
Liga MX players
Club Olimpia footballers
Club Guaraní players
Atlético Junior footballers
Club Necaxa footballers
Copa Libertadores-winning players
Paraguay international footballers
Paraguayan expatriate footballers
Expatriate footballers in Colombia
Expatriate footballers in Mexico
1995 Copa América players
Sportspeople from Luque
Association football forwards
Deportivo Santaní managers